Antonella Rinaldi (born October 12, 1954) is an Italian voice actress.

Biography
Rinaldi was born in Rome. She is the daughter of historical actor Giuseppe Rinaldi and actress Marina Dolfin and her maternal grandmother was operatic soprano Toti Dal Monte. She is best known for voicing Lois Griffin in the Italian-Language version of the animated sitcom Family Guy. She has also dubbed Jennifer Jason Leigh, Laura Linney, Jennifer Tilly, Amanda Plummer and Andie MacDowell in some of their films.

In 2011, she and her husband Mauro Gravina made a guest appearance on the web show Freaks!

Personal life
From her marriage to voice actor Mauro Gravina, they have a daughter, Benedetta, who is also a voice actress.

Dubbing roles

Animation
Lois Griffin in Family Guy
Laa-Laa in Teletubbies
Linda Flynn in Phineas and Ferb
Betty Beetle in Miss Spider's Sunny Patch Friends
Spindella in Miss Spider's Sunny Patch Friends
Chip (since 1990)
Webbigail "Webby" Vanderquack in DuckTales
Old One in The Land Before Time IV: Journey Through the Mists
Judy in Tweenies
Flat Person in ChalkZone

Live action
Amy Archer in The Hudsucker Proxy
Yolanda/"Honey Bunny" in Pulp Fiction
Stacy in Made in America
Alison Langley in Bean: The Ultimate Disaster Movie
Maria in Snakes on a Plane
Susan Robinson in Sesame Street
Mia in Catastrophe
Wynonna in Blue's Clues
Imani Izzi in Coming to America
Jackie Tyler in Doctor Who
Kate in The Six Wives of Henry Lefay
Jude in The Last Supper
Ophelia in Hamlet

References

External links
 

1954 births
Living people
Actresses from Rome
Italian voice actresses